Peter Howey (born 23 January 1958) is an English former professional footballer, who played for Huddersfield Town, Newport County, Scarborough & Frickley Athletic.

References
Kettering Town Vs Frickley matchday programme - 12/11/1985

1958 births
Living people
Sportspeople from Pontefract
English footballers
Association football midfielders
English Football League players
Huddersfield Town A.F.C. players
Newport County A.F.C. players
Frickley Athletic F.C. players
Scarborough F.C. players